Metallic Assault: A Tribute to Metallica is a tribute album to heavy metal band Metallica. It features Metallica covers played not by formal bands, but collaborations between musicians from several bands. Songs from Kill 'Em All (1983) all the way to Metallica (1991), with the exception of ...And Justice for All (1988), are featured. Robert Trujillo, who later joined Metallica in 2003, plays bass on two tracks.

Track listing

See also
 Metallic Attack: The Ultimate Tribute
 Pianotarium: Piano Tribute to Metallica

Metallica tribute albums
2001 compilation albums